The 2010 Southland Conference tournament was held at Bobcat Softball Complex on the campus of Texas State University in San Marcos, Texas, from May 13 through 15, 2010. The tournament winner, McNeese State earned the Southland Conference's automatic bid to the 2010 NCAA Division I softball tournament. The Championship game was broadcast over the regionally syndicated Southland Conference Television Network for the first time with the remainder of the tournament airing on the Southland Digital Network.  Doug Anderson and LaDarrin McClane called the games.

Format
The top 6 teams qualified for the Southland softball tournament.  The tournament was played in a double-elimination format with a maximum of eleven games.

Tournament

All times listed are Central Daylight Time.

Line Scores

Day One

Game 1 (Texas A&M-Corpus Christi vs McNeese State)

Game 2 (Nicholls State vs Texas-Arlington)

Game 3 (McNeese State vs Stephen F. Austin)

Game 4 (Texas-Arlington vs Texas State)

Day Two

Game 5 (Stephen F. Austin vs Nicholls State)

Game 6 (Texas-Arlington vs Texas A&M-Corpus Christi)

Day Three

Game 7 (Texas State vs McNeese State)

Semi-final Game One (Stephen F. Austin vs Texas-Arlington)

Semi-final Game Two (Texas-Arlington vs Texas State)

Championship Game (McNeese State vs Texas State)

Awards and honors
Source:  

Tournament MVP: Meagan Bond - McNeese State

All-Tournament Teams:

 Kendal Harper - Stephen F. Austin
 Teri Lyles - Texas-Arlington
 McKenzie Baak - Texas State
 Jenna Emery - Texas State
 Chandler Hall - Texas State
 Anna Hernandez - Texas State
 Molly Guidry - McNeese State
 Marissa Koetting - McNeese State
 Heather Mosser - McNeese State
 Claire Terracina - McNeese State
 Meagan Bond - McNeese State

See also
2010 Southland Conference baseball tournament

References

Southland Conference softball tournament
Tournament